Alexey Vasilyevich Lyaporov  (born 19 April 1979 in Pyatigorsk, Stavropol Krai) is a creative producer of Comedy Club TV show on TNT channel (since 2012), a former member and author of the “Pyatigorsk” KVN team, one of the screenwriters of the iconic sketch comedy show "Nasha Russia" and the film "Our Russia. The Balls of Fate".

Biography 

Since 2000 Alexey was an author and member of the “Pyatigorsk” KVN team. In 2004, the Team became the champion of the KVN Top League of Russia.
In 2006, he became a Comedy Club script writer. In 2008 he became an editor, since 2012 – a creative producer of the show.
From 2006 to 2011 Alexey was one of the screenwriters of the iconic sketch comedy "Nasha Russia". In 2008, he was also one of the screenwriters of the feature film "Our Russia. The Balls of Fate".
In 2014, 2016, 2018 and 2021 he was one of the authors of Pavel Volya's solo concerts "Big Stand Up".

Awards

For the Comedy Club project 
 TEFI Award in the category "Humorous program" (2017).

Personal life 
Married. Has four children.

References 

Living people
1979 births
Russian television personalities
Russian male comedians
KVN